Bastian Trinker (born 11 May 1990) is an Austrian professional tennis player. He competes mainly in the ITF circuit, where he has eight singles titles and three doubles titles.

He played his first ATP main draw match at the 2015 BMW Open after gaining entry as a lucky loser. In the same year he won his first ATP Tour match in Umag, where he won the qualification and then beat the former top-10 player Mikhail Youzhny in the first round.

References

External links
 
 
 

Living people
1990 births
Austrian male tennis players